Alexander "Sandy" Lipsey is a Democratic politician from the U.S. state of Michigan. As a member of the Michigan State House of Representatives, he represented the 60th District from 2000 to 2006. On July 20, 2007, Lipsey was appointed by Michigan Governor Jennifer Granholm to replace Judge Philip Schaefer on the Kalamazoo County Circuit Court.

Education
Lipsey earned his Juris Doctor from the University of Michigan Law School and his bachelor's degree from Kalamazoo College.

Political career
Constrained by state term limits, Lipsey placed an unsuccessful bid for the Michigan State Senate in 2006, facing defeat to incumbent state senator Tom George of Portage, Michigan.

References

1950 births
21st-century American judges
21st-century American politicians
Kalamazoo College alumni
Living people
Democratic Party members of the Michigan House of Representatives
Michigan state court judges
University of Michigan Law School alumni